Charlie Otainao (born 5 June 1992) is a Solomon Islander footballer who plays as a midfielder for Fijian Club Rewa F.C., He Moved to Rewa F.C. from Kossa F.C. of Solomon Islands S-League. in 2018.

References

1992 births
Living people
Solomon Islands footballers
Association football midfielders
Futsal forwards
Solomon Islands international footballers
Kossa F.C. players